Curtis Edward Good (born 23 March 1993) is an Australian footballer who plays as a defender for Melbourne City in the A-League. He began his career with the club (then called Melbourne Heart) before signing for Newcastle United in 2012. He subsequently had loan spells with Bradford City – for whom he appeared in the 2013 Football League Cup Final – and Dundee United. After being released by Newcastle, he returned to Melbourne in 2018. Good made his international debut for Australia in 2014 and was in the provisional squad for that year's World Cup, but missed out on selection through injury.

Club career

Melbourne Heart
Good was born in Melbourne, Victoria and attended Wesley College. While growing up, Good met Jackson Irvine when "they were both ten and lived two minutes from each other and grew up together". They would also "ran cross countries together, played for Knox City (in Melbourne) as juniors".

In 2008, he was offered a two-year scholarship at the Australian Institute of Sport which he commenced in Canberra in 2009. In February 2011 Good signed a multi-year senior contract with A-League club Melbourne Heart after impressing as a short-term injury replacement. His first league appearance for Melbourne Heart was in round 1 of the 2011–12 A-League season against Newcastle Jets.

Newcastle United
In July 2012, Good, having been granted a work permit, joined English Premier League club Newcastle United on a six-year deal for a reported transfer fee of $600,000 AUD. Good was named on the substitute bench for the first time for the senior side in the defeat away to Manchester City in March 2013. He made his debut for Newcastle in their 2–0 League Cup win over Morecambe on 28 August 2013.

Bradford City loan
In November 2012, after several appearances for Newcastle's reserves, Good signed on loan for Bradford City. He made his senior debut in English football for The Bantams in a 1–1 draw against Brentford in the second round of the FA Cup. He was not registered by the 12pm deadline on the day of the game, causing Bradford City to initially be removed from the FA Cup. This was however reduced to a £1000 fine on appeal. In February 2013, Good appeared for Bradford in the 2013 Football League Cup Final at Wembley, won 5–0 by Premier League opponents Swansea City. Good was substituted at half-time.

Dundee United loan
On 31 January 2014, Good signed for Scottish Premiership club Dundee United on loan until the end of the 2013–14 season.

Return to Newcastle
Following his return from injury, Good next appeared for Newcastle's first team when he started on 28 January 2017 in a 3–0 FA Cup defeat against Oxford United. He was released at the end of the 2017–18 season.

Melbourne City
Good completed a return to Australia on 18 September 2018 by rejoining Melbourne City; who were previously known as Melbourne Heart.

International career

Good made his international debut for Australia starting in a friendly match against Ecuador on 5 March 2014. He suffered a hip injury in the match against Ecuador and missed the rest of the 2013–14 club season, but was still named in Australia's provisional 30-man squad for the 2014 FIFA World Cup. He was withdrawn from the squad after failing to recover from his injury.

Good made his first appearance in a World Cup Qualifier on 7 June 2021 in a World Cup Qualifier against Taiwan.

Career statistics

Club

International

Honours
Bradford City
League Cup Runners-up: 2012–13

Melbourne City
 A-League Premiership: 2020–21

Individual
A-Leagues All Star: 2022
 PFA A-League Team of the Season: 2020–21, 2021–22

References

1993 births
Living people
Australian Institute of Sport soccer players
Australian expatriate soccer players
Soccer players from Melbourne
Australian expatriate sportspeople in Scotland
Australian expatriate sportspeople in England
Association football defenders
Melbourne City FC players
Newcastle United F.C. players
Bradford City A.F.C. players
Dundee United F.C. players
A-League Men players
English Football League players
Scottish Professional Football League players
Victorian Institute of Sport alumni
Expatriate footballers in England
Expatriate footballers in Scotland
Australia international soccer players
Australian soccer players